The David di Donatello for Best Sets and Decorations is a film award presented annually by the Accademia del Cinema Italiano (ACI, Academy of Italian Cinema) to recognize outstanding efforts on the part of film set designers and decorators who have worked within the Italian film industry during the year preceding the ceremony. It was first presented during the 1981 edition of the David di Donatello award show.

Winners and nominees
Winners are indicated in bold.

1980s
1981
 Mario Garbuglia - The Lady of the Camellias
 Andrea Crisanti - Three Brothers
 Luigi Scaccianoce - Fontamara

1982
 Lorenzo Baraldi - Il marchese del Grillo
 Andrea Crisanti - Talcum Powder
 Dante Ferretti - Tales of Ordinary Madness
 Lorenzo Baraldi - Portrait of a Woman, Nude

1983
 Dante Ferretti - That Night in Varennes
 Marco Ferreri - The Story of Piera
 Gianni Sbarra - The Night of the Shooting Stars

1984
 Dante Ferretti - And the Ship Sails On
 Luciano Ricceri - Le Bal
 Elena Ricci Poccetto - Where's Picone?

1985
 Enrico Job - Carmen
 Francesco Bronzi - Kaos
 Enrico Fiorentini - A Proper Scandal

1986
 Enrico Job - Camorra
 Dante Ferretti - Ginger and Fred
 Luciano Ricceri - Macaroni

1987
 Dante Ferretti - The Name of the Rose
 Mario Chiari - Via Montenapoleone
 Luciano Ricceri - The Family

1988
 Bruno Cesari, Osvaldo Desideri, and Ferdinando Scarfiotti - The Last Emperor
 Danilo Donati - Intervista
 Mario Garbuglia - Dark Eyes

1989
 Danilo Donati - Francesco
 Lucia Mirisola - ’O Re
 Ferdinando Scarfiotti - Fair Game

1990s
1990
 Dante Ferretti - The Voice of the Moon
 Giantito Burchiellaro - The Bachelor
 Amedeo Fago and Franco Velchi - Open Doors
 Mario Garbuglia - The Miser
 Franco Velchi - Dark Illness

1991
 Paolo Biagetti and Luciano Ricceri - Captain Fracassa's Journey
 Gianni Sbarra - The Sun Also Shines at Night
 Andrea Crisanti - Everybody's Fine
 Lucia Mirisola and Paola Comencini - In the Name of the Sovereign People

1992
 Carlo Simi - Bix
 Andrea Crisanti - The Stolen Children
 Ezio Frigerio - The Inner Circle

1993
 Gianna Sbarra - Fiorile
 Giancarlo Muselli - Death of a Neapolitan Mathematician
 Carlo Simi - La valle di pietra

1994
 Antonello Geleng - Cemetery Man
 Giantito Burchiellaro - Sparrow
 Enrico Fiorentini - For Love, Only for Love

1995
 Andrea Crisanti - A Pure Formality
 Giantito Burchiellaro - Sostiene Pereira
 Gianni Quaranta - Farinelli

1996
 Francesco Bronzi - The Star Maker
 Enrico Job - The Nymph
 Gianni Silvestri - Stealing Beauty

1997
 Danilo Donati - Marianna Ucrìa
 Giancarlo Basili - Nirvana
 Giantito Burchiellaro - The Prince of Homburg
 Andrea Crisanti - The Truce
 Gianni Sbarra - The Elective Affinities

1998
 Danilo Donati - Life Is Beautiful
 Alberto Cottignoli and Stefano Tonelli - The Best Man
 Luciano Ricceri - Kaputt Mundi

1999
 Francesco Frigeri - The Legend of 1900
 Giancarlo Basili - The Way We Laughed
 Enrico Job - Ferdinando and Carolina

2000s
2000
 Francesco Bronzi - Canone inverso
 Marco Dentici - The Nanny
 Antonello Geleng and Marina Pinzuti - Love in the Mirror (Amor nello specchio)

2001
 Luciano Ricceri - Unfair Competition
 Giancarlo Basili - The Son's Room
 Francesco Frigeri - Malèna

2002
 Luigi Marchione - The Prefession of Arms
 Giancarlo Basili - Paz!
 Francesco Frigeri - Vajont2003
 Danilo Donati - Pinocchio Paolo Bonfini - The Embalmer Giantito Burchiellaro - The Soul Keeper Marco Dentici - My Mother's Smile Simona Migliotti - Incantato2004
 Luigi Marchione - Singing Behind Screens Paola Bizzarri - Agata and the Storm Franco Ceraolo - The Best of Youth Marco Dentici - What Will Happen to Us Francesco Frigeri - Don't Move2005
 Andrea Crisanti - Cuore Sacro Giancarlo Basili - An Italian Romance Francesca Bocca - After Midnight Marco Dentici - The Life That I Want Beatrice Scarpato - The Remains of Nothing2006
 Paola Comencini - Romanzo Criminale Giancarlo Basili - The Caiman Andrea Crisanti - The Goodbye Kiss Carlo De Marino - Fuoco su di me Maurizio Marchitelli - My Best Enemy2007
 Carlos Conti - Nuovomondo Francesco Frigeri - Napoleon and Me Tonino Zera - The Unknown Woman Giuseppe Pirrotta - One Hundred Nails Andrea Crisanti - The Lark Farm2008
 Francesco Frigeri - I Viceré Paola Bizzarri - Days and Clouds Giada Calabria - Quiet Chaos Alessandra Mura - The Girl by the Lake Tonino Zera - Hotel Meina2009
 Francesco Frigeri - The Demons of St. Petersberg Giancarlo Basili - Wild Blood Paolo Bonfini - Gomorrah Giantito Burchiellaro - Caravaggio Lino Fiorito - Il divo2010s
2010
 Marco Dentici - Vincere Gian Carlo Basili - The Man Who Will Come Andrea Crisanti - Loose Cannons Maurizio Sabatini - Baarìa Tonino Zera - The First Beautiful Thing2011
 Emita Frigato - Noi credevamo Francesco Frigeri - Amici miei - Come tutto ebbe inizio Paola Comencini - Benvenuti al Sud Paki Meduri - Into Paradiso Tonino Zera - Angel of Evil2012
 Paola Bizzarri - We Have a Pope Francesco Frigeri - The Entrepreneur Andrea Crisanti - Magnificent Presence Giancarlo Basili - Piazza Fontana: The Italian Conspiracy Stefania Cella - This Must Be the Place2013
 Maurizio Sabatini and Raffaella Giovannetti - The Best Offer Paolo Bonfini - Reality Marco Dentici - It Was the Son Marta Maffucci - Diaz – Don't Clean Up This Blood Rita Rabassini - Siberian Education2014
 Stefania Cella - The Great Beauty Giancarlo Basili - Those Happy Years Marco Dentici - Salvo Marta Maffucci - Fasten Your Seatbelts Mauro Radaelli - Human Capital2015
 Giancarlo Muselli - Leopardi Luca Servino - Black Souls Emita Frigato - Wondrous Boccaccio Paki Meduri - The Legendary Giulia and Other Miracles Giuseppe Pirrotta - Greenery Will Bloom Again2016
 Dimitri Capuani and Alessia Anfuso - Tale of Tales Maurizio Sabatini - The Correspondence Massimiliano Sturiale - They Call Me Jeeg Giada Calabria - Don't Be Bad Paki Meduri - Suburra Ludovica Ferrario - Youth2017
 Tonino Zera - Like Crazy Marcello Di Carlo - At War with Love Carmine Guarino - Indivisible Marco Dentici - Sweet Dreams Livia Borgognoni - La stoffa dei sogni2018
 Deniz Gokturk Kobanbay and Ivana Gargiulo - Napoli velata Noemi Marchica - Ammore e malavita Maurizio Sabatini - Brutti e cattivi Tonino Zera - The Girl in the Fog Giancarlo Basili - Tenderness Luca Servino - Bloody Richard2019
  Dimitri Capuani - Dogman Giancarlo Muselli - Capri-Revolution Samuel Deshors - Call Me by Your Name Emita Frigato - Happy as Lazzaro Stefania Cella - Loro2020s
2020
 Dimitri Capuani - Pinocchio Nello Giorgetti - 5 Is the Perfect Number Tonino Zera - The First King: Birth of an Empire Andrea Castorina - The Traitor Inbal Weinberg - Suspiria''

References

External links
 
 David di Donatello official website

David di Donatello